Vertigo, also known as DC Vertigo, was an imprint of American comic book publisher DC Comics started in 1993, with the purpose of publishing comics with adult content that did not fit the restrictions of DC's main line, allowing for more creative freedom. It consisted of company-owned titles such as The Sandman and Hellblazer, as well as creator-owned titles such as Preacher and Fables. The imprint was discontinued in January 2020, and future reprinted material will be published under the new DC Black Label imprint, intended for mature audiences.

Collected editions 
The collected editions listed here reprint material in standard-size hardcovers and trade paperbacks, including original graphic novels.

0–9

A

B

C

D

E

F

G

H

I

J

K

L

M

N

O

P

Q

R

S

T

U

V

W

Y

Deluxe Edition 
Deluxe Editions reprint material in a dustjacketed oversized hardcover format, and often contains bonus material such as illustrations or variant covers.

Omnibus 
Omnibus volumes reprint material in a high-quality oversized hardcover format, and includes supplemental material.

Absolute Edition 
Absolute Editions reprint material in dustjacketed and slipcased hardcovers, and includes supplemental material ranging from illustrations by the series' artists to the original scripts for the reprinted issues.

Other collections

References



 List_of_Vertigo_reprint_collections
Lists of comics by DC Comics